Mike Berland (born April 6, 1968) is founder and CEO of Decode_M, an insights and strategy firm. Prior to founding Decode_M in 2016, he was CEO of Edelman Berland, the global intelligence, research, and analytics division of Edelman. Before joining Edelman Berland in 2012, he was President of the market research and polling firm Penn, Schoen & Berland.

He is the author of Maximum Momentum (Reagan Arts, 2020) and the co-author of What Makes You Tick? How Successful People Do It—And What You Can Learn from Them (HarperCollins, May 2009) with his PSB partner Douglas Schoen. He is also the co-author of Fat-Burning Machine: The 12-Week Plan (Reagan Arts, December 2015) with former Olympic triathlon coach Gale Bernhardt.

Berland has served as strategic advisor to political leaders including Michael Bloomberg and Hillary Clinton and leading companies such as Facebook. For the 2008–2009 season, Berland was the head of communications for the National Hockey League (NHL). He regularly appeared on Fox Business Network's Mornings with Maria in 2015 to discuss political strategy.

Education 
Berland attended The Latin School of Chicago and graduated magna cum laude from the University of Massachusetts Amherst, where he was a Commonwealth Scholar. He received his initial training at the Social and Demographic Research Institute.

Penn Schoen Berland 
In his former role as president of PSB, Berland led global business development, building on PSB's client and research work in Europe, Asia and Latin America. Penn, Schoen & Berland was acquired by WPP in 2001.

Corporate consulting 
Berland has developed communications campaigns for brands, including RIM/Blackberry. As a partner at PSB, he helps his clients through the use of research, image analysis, message development, and corporate and product positioning and targeting.

Sports and entertainment work 
In 2003, Berland served as the Dixie Chicks' political crisis consultant, advising the band amid its controversial criticism of President Bush. Berland had a cameo appearance in director Barbara Kopple's documentary "Shut Up & Sing", which followed the Dixie Chicks for three years during which they were under political attack and received death threats in response to their anti-Bush comment.

Just after the 2004 election, Berland and his partner Doug Schoen published a study in the LA Times, calling Super Bowl Sunday "the 11th national holiday" and the only true "uniter, not divider." Their survey of 1,735 Americans found that Super Bowl watchers are football and non-football fans alike who plan further ahead for the event than they do for any other major holiday.

In 2009, Berland served as the Director of Communications and Editorial for the NHL (National Hockey League). In his role, he was responsible for public relations and editorial content for the NHL across all media assets.

Political campaigns 
Berland has worked with political candidates in the US and abroad. He served as strategic advisor to New York City Mayor Michael Bloomberg in his 2001 and 2005 mayoral campaigns and led the targeting and direct mail effort for Hillary Clinton's 2006 Senate and 2008 Presidential campaigns.

What Makes You Tick? 

In May 2009, Berland and his partner Douglas Schoen released What Makes You Tick? How Successful People Do It—And What You Can Learn from Them (HarperCollins), analyzing how successful people found success in their chosen field. Through interviews with 50 leaders in a variety of fields, the authors classified each of these high achievers into one of five "success archetypes": "Natural-Born Leaders," "Independence Seekers," "Visionaries", "Do-Gooders", and "Independents Who Follow Their Dreams". The authors then argue that if one can identify one's own success archetype and learn how to leverage it, one can achieve success.

Personal life 

Berland currently lives in New York City with his wife Marcella and has two grown children, Matthew and Isabella. He previously served on the board of trustees at the Latin School of Chicago and chaired the Gotham chapter of the Young Presidents' Organization (YPO) in NYC.

References

External links 
 Michael Berland
 Edelman
 Penn, Schoen and Berland Associates
 Decode_M

Living people
University of Massachusetts Amherst alumni
1968 births